Fernando Jorge Fígueiredo Campos, known as Nando (born 9 November 1963) is a retired Angolan-born Portuguese football midfielder.

References

1963 births
Living people
Portuguese footballers
Rio Ave F.C. players
Vitória F.C. players
F.C. Penafiel players
A.D. Ovarense players
Leça F.C. players
F.C. Marco players
Vilanovense F.C. players
Association football midfielders
Primeira Liga players
Portugal youth international footballers